Jamal Manuel Issa Serrano (born 22 November 1996), known professionally as Jamule, is a German rapper of Spanish and Lebanese descent from Essen.

Life 
Jamule's mother was from Andalusia and his father from Lebanon. Immediately after birth, his parents moved to Mülheim and one year later to Essen, where he grew up in the borough Kray. However, he went to school in Mülheim so he constantly commuted. His mother Maria Serrano Serrano was a dancer and member of the pop group Passion Fruit and died in a plane crash in 2001 when Jamule was five years old.

In October 2018 he signed a contract with Life is Pain, a label from the German rapper PA Sports. According to PA Sports' statement, Jamule got the biggest advance payment for a German newcomer ever.
"Ich hol dich ab" was his first top-10 single. With the song "Unterwegs", he worked together with the rap producer team KitschKrieg and reached the top of the Official German singles chart in September 2020.

Discography

Albums

EPs

Singles

Featured in

Other charted songs

Awards and nominations

Results

References

External links 

German rappers
1996 births
Living people
People from Essen
German people of Lebanese descent
German people of Spanish descent